Nephopterix obscuribasella is a species of snout moth in the genus Nephopterix. It was described by Ragonot in 1887. It was described from Saisan.

References

Moths described in 1887
Phycitini